This is a list of episodes in the radio drama Jungle Jam and Friends: The Radio Show!.

Description
Between 1993 and 1995, three audio cassette tape sets containing episodes of Jungle Jam and Friends were released by Everland Entertainment, a division of Word Entertainment. The sets were: Wild Times in God's Creation (1993), More Wild Times in God's Creation (1994), and Even Wilder Times in God's Creation (1995). They all contained episodes as they aired on the radio. This was evident because of the contact information read aloud by Nathan Carlson, including that of World Vision International, a religious and charitable organization involved in sponsoring Jungle Jam and Friends. In addition, Even Wilder Times was a collection of musical albums previously released by Word Entertainment and edited for broadcast in two parts on the radio.

When Woolly Mammoth Entertainment, the studio that produced Jungle Jam and Friends, was renamed Fancy Monkey Studios and acquired ownership of the show, it re-released all the original albums in compact disc and digital download formats. These re-releases do not follow the same release sequence as the original cassette albums and were slightly reorganized. In addition, the original opening and closing wraps of all Jungle Jam and Friends episodes were edited to remove references to World Vision and Everland, and replaced with new wraps referencing Fancy Monkey Studios and the reorganized episodes. While most of the episodes from the cassette albums are retained in the CD and download re-releases, a few of them are excluded, most notably the "Sing-Along with Bert-the-Moose" segments, which served as a platform for promoting kid-friendly Contemporary Christian musical albums released by Word Entertainment. And while all the original episode titles stay the same, only one episode was renamed. "Bear E. Sleepy", a musical segment that originally appeared in the More Wild Times cassette album,  became "The All-Bear Sing-Along".

A fourth collection, Yet Even Wilder Times Collection, contains most of the Jungle Jam and Friends episodes that do not appear in any of the original three albums, some of which have been produced and aired in recent years. It is currently available for purchase from Fancy Monkey Studios as downloads only.

"Open for Business", which appears in the Wild Times cassette album, was not a Jungle Jam and Friends episode. Instead, it was an excerpt from The Friendship Company: Open for Business (1991), a children's album by Contemporary Christian singer Sandi Patty. As such, it is also excluded from the re-releases.

In the original opening and closing wraps of "The Great Rubber Band War" (from the More Wild Times collection), Hal Smith, Will Ryan, and Katie Leigh — all voice artists involved in Adventures in Odyssey, a radio drama presentation produced by Focus on the Family — made brief appearances, voicing their respective characters John Avery Whittaker, Eugene Meltsner, and Connie Kendall. They all accidentally stumble into the room where Nathan Carlson and the Jungle Jam gang are doing their show, and are given correct directions to their room ("Just two doors down to the left"). Even Whit (voiced by Smith) is given the opportunity to read the following line used before the episodes start: "Stay tuned! Jungle Jam and Friends has just begun!".

"Three Wise Men and a Baby", a Christmas musical album, was not included in any of the original cassette sets. However, like other Jungle Jam and Friends musical albums, it is available separately, first on cassette tape, and later on CD and digital download. Eventually, it is now included in the re-release of Even Wilder Times.

List of episodes
Please note: This episode list follows the original release sequence.

Wild Times in God's Creation

More Wild Times in God's Creation

Even Wilder Times in God's Creation

Miscellaneous download-only episodes

References 

Jungle Jam and Friends: The Radio Show!
Jungle Jam and Friends